Atwater v. Lago Vista, 532 U.S. 318 (2001), was a United States Supreme Court decision which held that a person's Fourth Amendment rights are not violated when the subject is arrested for driving without a seatbelt. The court ruled that such an arrest for a misdemeanor that is punishable only by a fine does not constitute an unreasonable seizure under the Fourth Amendment.

Facts
Texas law provides for police officer discretion in arresting any person caught committing a misdemeanor, such as violating its mandatory seat belt laws. Violation of its seat belt law in 1999 was punishable with the maximum fine of $50.  In March 1997, Gail Atwater, a long-term resident of Lago Vista, Texas, was driving her pick-up truck with her three-year-old son and five-year-old daughter from soccer practice.  One of the children had lost a toy and she allowed them to unbuckle their seat belts to stand to search for the toy; hence, none of them were wearing their seat belts. Police officer Bart Turek, then with the city of Lago Vista, recognized Ms. Atwater and pulled her over. According to court records, witnesses observed that Atwater and her children remained in her pick up when Turek approached the driver's side window and aggressively jabbed his finger toward Atwater's face. According to Atwater's complaint (allegations, previously supported by witnesses at the scene, that the court also presumed to be true for its purposes), Turek screamed at Atwater about the seatbelts, frightening her children. When Atwater requested that Turek lower his voice, Turek immediately yelled in response, "you’re going to jail." According to the record, Atwater remained calm when Turek told her that she was going to jail. The record also stated that Atwater did not act suspiciously, did not pose any threat to Turek, and did not engage in any illegal conduct other than failing to wear a seat belt. Turek continued to verbally abuse Atwater, accusing her of not caring for her children.

After telling Atwater that she would be taken to jail, Turek demanded her driver's license and proof of insurance. When Atwater informed Turek that her purse had been stolen a couple of days ago and that her license and insurance card were in the purse, Turek told Atwater that he had "heard that story two-hundred times." Atwater provided her address from her checkbook. Atwater then asked Turek to allow her to take her "frightened, upset, and crying" children to a friend's home located just two houses away before taking her to jail, but he refused her request. Turek told her "[y]ou're not going anywhere" and stated that her children could accompany her to the police station. A friend of Atwater's who came to the scene, took the children into her care while the officer arrested Atwater. Turek handcuffed Atwater, in front of her two young children, placed her in his squad car, did not fasten her seat belt, and drove her to the police station to be booked and fingerprinted. According to the court document, "booking officers had her remove her shoes, jewelry, and eyeglasses, and empty her pockets. Officers took Atwater's 'mug shot' and placed her alone in a jail cell for about one hour."  A magistrate released Atwater on $310 bond. She later paid three $50 fines for each violation of Texas's seat belt law - one for her and each of her children. The charges of driving without a license and without proof of insurance were dismissed.

Atwater and her husband, Michael Haas, an emergency room physician at a local hospital, filed suit under 42 U.S.C. § 1983, represented by Charles Lincoln, alleging that the city violated her Fourth Amendment right to be free from unreasonable seizures by arresting her for a crime whose only punishment was a fine. This argument required her to concede that the police had probable cause to arrest her for violating the seat belt law, and thus the United States District Court for the Western District of Texas found summary judgment for the city. A panel of the Fifth Circuit reversed, holding that arresting a person for a fine-only misdemeanor was per se unreasonable. The Fifth Circuit sitting en banc reversed the panel, agreeing with the district court's reasoning. Three judges dissented from the en banc panel's ruling, arguing that the police had to have a specific reason for arresting Atwater for only violating the seat belt law. The U.S. Supreme Court agreed to hear the case.

Majority opinion
The court started by analyzing and rejecting Atwater's argument that the common law did not grant authority to police officers to execute warrantless arrests for misdemeanors that did not involve a breach of the peace. The court, recognizing the lack of unanimity of a common law rule, found that the historical common law had a "decided, majority view that the police did not need to obtain an arrest warrant merely because a misdemeanor stopped short of violence or threat of it" and hence the argument had failed.

The majority conceded that "If we were to derive a rule exclusively to address the uncontested facts of this case, Atwater might well prevail."  The majority also acknowledged specific directness in its actual opinion, "suggesting that courts look with 'disfavor' on such legislative enactments 'as interfering with the constitutional liberties of the subject'." Furthermore, the majority decision concluded that "warrantless misdemeanor arrests [may not] need constitutional attention," and that "It is of course easier to devise a minor-offense limitation by statute than to derive one through the Constitution"  Thus, the court rejected adopting a new Constitutional law rule by focusing on administrability concerns. It then held that probable cause was the issue and that the standard had been met.

Analysis
The Court held officer "Turek was authorized (though not required) to make a custodial arrest without balancing costs and benefits or determining whether Atwater's arrest was in some sense necessary."  Atwater v. City of Lago Vista, 532 U.S. 318, 322.
In Wilson v. Arkansas, the Court considered whether the Fourth Amendment required the police to knock first and announce their presence before entering a person's home.  To decide that issue, the Court deemed it necessary to examine whether the common law required the police to knock and announce their presence.  The Court's analysis in this case proceeded along similar lines.  Atwater claimed that the Framers of the Fourth Amendment understood an "unreasonable" seizure to include a warrantless arrest for a misdemeanor offense that was not a "breach of the peace."  The Court examined the historical evidence of practice in England during the Middle Ages and in the 17th and 18th centuries and in America from the time of the ratification of the Bill of Rights to modern times.  Though the Court did find some evidence favoring Atwater's position, it determined that much of the historical precedent contradicted her argument.   In the end, the Court's common law analysis supported the proposition that a police officer could arrest any person for a misdemeanor committed in his or her presence.

Atwater had urged the Court to adopt a "bright-line" rule that the police not arrest anyone for an offense that did not carry jail time unless the government could show a compelling need to detain the person.  At first blush, the Court conceded, this rule appeared easily administrable by police officers, which would serve the government's interest in rules that are easy to apply on the spot.  But in thinking through many possible applications of the rule Atwater proposed, the Court found it more difficult to apply.  Court opinion stated that it is not reasonable to expect the average police officer to know the details of "frequently complex penalty schemes", especially since the penalty associated with seemingly identical conduct can vary with the facts that are difficult to discern at the scene of a crime, such as whether the suspect is a repeat offender or the weight of drugs.  Furthermore, even if the officer could make that distinction on the spot, he could not know how the district attorney will later choose to charge the offense.

Police routinely exercise discretion in their work.  Requiring the police to decide whether a crime is a fine-only crime, for which he could not arrest the suspect, in the heat of the moment ultimately exposes the police to greater legal consequences—either exclusion of illegally obtained evidence, or personal liability for violating the suspect's constitutional rights.  Balancing of Fourth Amendment interests through "probable cause" and "extraordinary" circumstances has been delineated in Terry v. Ohio, .  Given the choice to abandon or abridge the requirement of probable cause for arrest in the case of fine-only misdemeanors, the Court ruled that the Fourth Amendment imposed the same standard for all crimes: probable cause.

The Court's decision in this case ultimately involved the extent of law-enforcement discretion in exercising their duties.  After asking in oral argument, "how bad the problem is out there?" the court admonished Atwater's counsel's failure to provide it with "indications of comparably foolish, warrantless misdemeanor arrests."  The majority opinion ultimately emphasized a specific view that "Multiplied many times over, the costs to society of such underenforcement could easily outweigh the costs to defendants of being needlessly arrested and booked."

Dissenting opinion
Justice O'Connor, presenting the (4-5) dissenting opinion, stated that the historical evidence was not uniform in rejecting Atwater's proposed rule and reasoned that the Fourth Amendment required a balancing of interests in the case of an arrest for a fine-only misdemeanor.  The court dissent in Atwater precluded the sole use of probable cause in Whren v. United States, where the Court had held that, on balance, it was reasonable to allow the police to make a traffic stop whenever they spied a violation of the traffic laws, although a traffic stop was a seizure. But, because of the length of the typical traffic stop and the fact that most drivers are free to go after it is done, such a seizure was commensurate with the magnitude of the violation and sufficient to ensure that the offender would appear later in court if necessary.  The dissent elucidated, "probable cause" and "extraordinary" circumstances as delineated in Terry v. Ohio, Whren v. United States, etc., have also proved less than problematic.  Strong argument to the contrary also remains as to the merit of the majority opinion that "personal § 1983 liability for the misapplication of a constitutional standard…would guarantee increased litigation." In Atwater, the dissent further argued that Atwater could not have been characterized as a possible flight risk by the arresting officer, since she was known to him and was an established member of the community and that respondents failed to substantiate any demonstrable merit for the arrest decision. They further noted that arrest for a fine-only misdemeanor was not reasonable because sending someone to jail for up to 48 hours (the time necessary to get him or her before a magistrate to be released) was too great an intrusion upon the personal liberty interests of anyone who had committed a relatively minor offense as would only merit such a fine as punishment.

The Atwater dissenting court opinion states, "A broad range of conduct falls into the category of fine-only misdemeanors...   Such unbounded discretion [given to law enforcement] carries with it grave potential for abuse.  The majority takes comfort in the lack of evidence of ‘an epidemic of unnecessary minor-offense arrests’."  Reasoning beyond the case of a misdemeanor arrest for a seat-belt-law violation, Justice O'Connor’s dissenting court opinion further cautions, "The Court’s error, however, does not merely affect disposition of this case. The per se rule that the Court creates has potentially serious consequences for the everyday lives of Americans." Justice O'Connor concludes the court's minority's dissent by stating, "The Court neglects the Fourth Amendment’s express command in the name of administrative ease.  In so doing, it cloaks the pointless indignity that Gail Atwater (and her children) suffered with the mantle of reasonableness."

Relation with search incident arrest

Along with the power to make a custodial arrest for any misdemeanor traffic offense, officers have the Constitutional authority to make a suspicionless search of any person incident to a custodial arrest.

However, the potential for a warrantless search of a vehicle incident to such misdemeanor arrests—combining the holdings of Atwater and New York v. Belton—has since been limited by Arizona v. Gant.

Gant limited searches incident to arrest to circumstances where it is reasonable to believe that: 1) the arrested individual might access the vehicle at the time of the search; or 2) the arrested individual's vehicle contains evidence of the offense that led to the arrest. The Court suggested in dictum that "when a recent occupant is arrested for a traffic violation, there will be no reasonable basis to believe the vehicle contains relevant evidence."

See also
 List of United States Supreme Court cases, volume 532
 List of United States Supreme Court cases

References

Further reading

External links
 
  Text of U.S.C.A. - Fifth Circuit: No. 98-50302, findlaw.com  (initial ruling of 3-judge panel, reversed en banc)
 Text of U.S.C.A. - Fifth Circuit: No. 98-50302 (en banc decision, affirmed 5-4 by the Supreme Court) (pdf)
  Text of the opinion, LII, Cornell University
  OYEZ Project
 Amicus brief from Americans for Effective Law Enforcement
 Information about applying Atwater in California, from the Alameda County District Attorney's office
 Amicus brief from the CATO Institute
 Amicus brief from the ACLU
 Amicus brief of the Solicitor General

United States Supreme Court cases
United States Fourth Amendment case law
2001 in United States case law
United States Supreme Court cases of the Rehnquist Court